The John Marshall House Museum is a historic house museum located in Old Shawneetown, Illinois. The museum is a historically inaccurate  (the original had a straight staircase, the reproduction a spiral one, for example) reproduction of the John Marshall House, which was located at the site until 1974; the original house was demolished so that the reproduction could be constructed. The original house was built in the early 19th century for banker John Marshall, who ran the first bank in the Illinois Territory. At the time of its demolition, the house was one of the oldest surviving brick buildings in Illinois.

The house was added to the National Register of Historic Places on November 15, 1972, but this designation failed to prevent its destruction eighteen months later.  Nevertheless, the original foundation remained, and the site retained significant integrity as a historical archaeological site.  As a result, the site itself qualified to be re-listed on the National Register in January 1975.

References

1819 establishments in Illinois
Houses in Gallatin County, Illinois
Historic house museums in Illinois
Houses completed in 1819
Houses on the National Register of Historic Places in Illinois
Museums in Gallatin County, Illinois
National Register of Historic Places in Gallatin County, Illinois